These are the results of the men's doubles competition, one of two events for male competitors in table tennis at the 2004 Summer Olympics in Athens.

Qualifying athletes

Seeds

  (champion, gold medalist) 
  (third round)
  (final, silver medalist) 
   (quarterfinals)
  (third round)
  (third round)
  (quarterfinals)
    (quarterfinals)

Final rounds

Preliminary rounds

References

External links
 Official Report of the XXVIII Olympiad, v.2. Digitally published by the LA84 Foundation.
 
 2004 Summer Olympics / Table Tennis / Doubles, Men. Olympedia.

Table tennis at the 2004 Summer Olympics
Men's events at the 2004 Summer Olympics